Francesco Valiani (born 29 October 1980) is an Italian footballer who plays as a midfielder.

Career

Rimini
Valiani joined Rimini along with Emmanuel Cascione. Valiani spent two-and-a-half seasons in Serie B with the club.

His final game (and goal) for Rimini was on 2008-01-26 and, ironically, against the team he would join the next week. Bologna won the match 2–1.

Bologna
Valiani joined Bologna in January 2008 for €2.5 million and helped them to promotion.

On 31 August 2008 he made his Serie A debut by scoring the winning goal in a shocking 2–1 win for Bologna at San Siro against AC Milan.

Parma
On 29 January 2010 Parma signed the midfielder from Bologna in return for winger Andrea Pisanu on joint ownership deals, both 50% registration rights of the players were tagged for €2.5 million. Valiani signed a -year contract.

In June 2011 Parma acquired Valiani outright and co-currently Andrea Pisanu jointed Bologna outright. Co-currently Alessandro Elia and Riccardo Pasi returned to their mother club.

Elia was valued an aggressive price of €1.5 million  While Pasi's 50% rights was valued an aggressive price of €1.6 million;  Valiani cost Parma €2.8 million  and co-currently Parma sold Andrea Pisanu outright for €2.5 million. The four deals made Bologna received €200,000 in net.

Siena
On 14 July 2012, Parma sold Valiani outright to fellow Serie A club Siena for just €100,000. In June and July 2012 Siena and Parma also made cash-less players only swap, namely: Brandão, Iacobucci, Pacini and Rossi of Siena for a total of €5.6 million; Coppola, Dellafiore, Doumbia and Galuppo of Parma also for a total of €5.6 million.

Return to Pistoiese
On 14 July 2019, he returned to his first club Pistoiese, signing a 2-year contract.

Footnotes

References

External links
 Profile at Gazzetta.it

1980 births
Living people
People from Pistoia
Sportspeople from the Province of Pistoia
Italian footballers
Association football midfielders
Serie A players
Serie B players
Serie C players
U.S. Pistoiese 1921 players
S.S. Maceratese 1922 players
Imolese Calcio 1919 players
Rimini F.C. 1912 players
Bologna F.C. 1909 players
Parma Calcio 1913 players
A.C.N. Siena 1904 players
Latina Calcio 1932 players
S.S.C. Bari players
U.S. Livorno 1915 players
Footballers from Tuscany